Spitalfields  is a district in the East End of London and within the London Borough of Tower Hamlets. The area is formed around Commercial Street and includes the locale around Brick Lane, Christ Church, Toynbee Hall and Commercial Tavern. It has several markets, including Spitalfields Market, the historic Old Spitalfields Market, Brick Lane Market and Petticoat Lane Market. It was part of the ancient parish of Stepney in the county of Middlesex and was split off as a separate parish in 1729. Just outside the City of London, the parish became part of the Metropolitan Board of Works area in 1855 as part of the Whitechapel District. It formed part of the County of London from 1889 and was part of the Metropolitan Borough of Stepney from 1900. It was abolished as a civil parish in 1921.

Origin and administration

Toponymy
The name Spitalfields appears in the form Spittellond in 1399; as The spitel Fyeld on the "Woodcut" map of London of c.1561; and as Spyttlefeildes, also in 1561. The land belonged to St Mary Spital, a priory or hospital (a lodging for travellers run by a religious order) erected on the east side of the Bishopsgate thoroughfare in 1197, from which its name is thought to derive ("spital" being a corruption of the word "hospital".) An alternative, and possibly earlier, name for the area was Lolsworth.

Administrative history
The area was a part of the Manor and Ancient Parish of Stepney before the Domesday Book of 1086. 

Parish areas originally had only ecclesiastical (church) functions; but the monasteries which had provided extensive charitable work on a voluntary basis, were dissolved by Henry VIII, creating increased hardship. The government responded by making parish areas take on civil functions, primarily a new Poor Law intended to fill the gap left by monasteries. 

Stepney was a very large and populous parish, so by the late 17th century had devolved it civil parish functions to autonomous areas called Hamlets (in this context meaning territorial sub-divisions, rather than small villages), of which Spitalfields was one.

In 1729, the Hamlet of Spitalfields became an independent parish. The area's parish church was Christ Church, Spitalfields, with St Stephen Spitalfields (demolished in 1930) added later. 

In 1855, the parish became part of the Whitechapel District of the Metropolitan Board of Works for certain infrastructure purposes. Spitalfields retained its civil parish functions.

Spitalfields became part of the Metropolitan Borough of Stepney in 1900 and was abolished as a civil parish in 1921. It became part of the London Borough of Tower Hamlets in 1965.

Representation

Nearly all (except a tiny area north of the railway, in Weaver's Ward) of the district is part of the Spitalfields & Banglatown ward, which elects two councillors to Tower Hamlets Borough Council. Spitalfields is in the Bethnal Green and Bow constituency, represented in the House of Commons of the UK Parliament since 2010 by Rushanara Ali of the Labour Party.

The Spitalfields Neighbourhood Planning Forum, which is constitituted of Spitalfields residents, business operators, community organisations and other local interests, is intended to help local people influence neighbourhood planning policies.

History

Rome
The Romans had a cemetery to the east of the Bishopsgate thoroughfare, which roughly follows the line of Ermine Street: the main highway to the north from Londinium. The cemetery was noticed by the antiquarian John Stow in 1576 and was the focus of a major archaeological excavation in the 1990s, following the redevelopment of Spitalfields Market. 

In 2013, lead isotope analysis of tooth enamel, by Dr Janet Montgomery of Durham University, led to the identification of the first person from Rome known to have been buried in Britain. She was a 25-year-old woman who was buried in a lead-lined stone sarcophagus, with unique jet and intricate glass grave goods, around the middle of the 4th century A.D.

St Mary Spital
In 1197, a priory, "The New Hospital of St Mary without Bishopsgate", latterly known as St Mary Spital, founded by Walter Brunus and his wife Roisia, was built on the site of the cemetery. It was one of the biggest hospitals in medieval England and had a large medieval cemetery with a stone charnel house and mortuary chapel. The chapel has been uncovered by archaeologists and preserved for public viewing. The priory and hospital were dissolved in 1539 under Henry VIII. Although the chapel and monastic buildings were mostly demolished, the area of the inner precinct of the priory maintained an autonomous administrative status as the Liberty of Norton Folgate. The adjacent outer precincts, to the south, were re-used for artillery practice by the gunners of the Tower of London. The area, known as the Old Artillery Ground was placed under the special jurisdiction of the Tower of London as one of its Tower Liberties. 

Other parts of the priory area were used for residential purposes by London dwellers seeking a rural retreat and by the mid-17th century further development extended eastward into the erstwhile open farmland of the Spital Field.

Huguenots

Spitalfields consisted mainly of fields and nursery gardens until its development in the late 17th century. The main local industry at that time was weaving, and many of the weavers were Huguenot refugees from France. Spitalfields' historic association with the silk industry was established by French Protestant (Huguenot) refugees who settled in the area after the Revocation of the Edict of Nantes in 1685. By settling outside the bounds of the City of London, they hoped to avoid the restrictive legislation of the City guilds. The Huguenots brought with them little, apart from their skills, and an Order in Council of 16 April 1687 raised £200,000 to relieve their poverty. In December 1687, the first report of the committee set up to administer the funds reported that 13,050 French refugees were settled in London, primarily around Spitalfields, but also in the nearby settlements of Bethnal Green, Shoreditch, Whitechapel and Mile End New Town.

The late 17th and 18th centuries saw an estate of well-appointed terraced houses, built to accommodate the master weavers controlling the silk industry, and grand urban mansions built around the newly created Bishops Square which adjoins the short section of the main east–west street known as Spital Square. Christ Church, Spitalfields on Fournier Street, designed by the architect Nicholas Hawksmoor, was built during the reign of Queen Anne to demonstrate the power of the established church to the dissenting Huguenots, who had built ten chapels in the area. More humble weavers dwellings were congregated in the Tenterground. The Spitalfields Mathematical Society was established in 1717. In 1846, it merged with the Royal Astronomical Society.

Spitalfields Market was established in 1638 when Charles I gave a licence for flesh, fowl and roots to be sold in what was then known as Spittle Fields. The market currently receives around 25,000 visitors every week.

Huguenots of Spitalfields is a registered charity promoting public understanding of the Huguenot heritage and culture in Spitalfields, the City of London and beyond. They arrange tours, talks, events and schools programmes to raise the Huguenot profile in Spitalfields and to raise funds for a permanent memorial to the Huguenots.

From the 1730s Irish weavers came, after a decline in the Irish linen industry, to take up work in the silk trade. The 18th century saw periodic crises in the silk industry, brought on by imports of French silk – in a lull between the wars between the two rivals; and imports of printed calicos. The depression in the trade and the prices paid to weavers led to protests. In 1769, the Spitalfield riots occurred when attempts were made to disperse protest meetings by weavers during the downturn in the market for silk. The riots ended in an Irish and a Huguenot weaver being hanged in front of the Salmon and Ball public house at Bethnal Green.

Price controls on amounts master weavers could pay journeymen for each piece were established, removing incentives to pay higher wages during good times. During bad times workers had no work. As the price was per piece, there was no incentive for using machinery, as the master would have to pay for the machine and still pay the same price per piece to journeymen. By 1822 labour rates were so above market labour rates, that much of the employment in silk manufacture had moved away. Remaining manufacture focussed on expensive fashion items, which required proximity to court and had higher margins.

In 1729, Spitalfields was detached from the parish of Stepney, and became an independent parish; by this time parish areas had both civil and ecclesiastical (church) functions. The area's parish church was Christ Church, Spitalfields, with St Stephen Spitalfields added later. The church of St Stephen Spitalfields was built in 1860 by public subscription but was demolished in 1930. The adjacent vicarage is all that remains.

Victorian era
 
By the Victorian era, the silk industry had entered a long decline and the old merchant dwellings had degenerated into multi-occupied slums. Spitalfields became a by-word for urban deprivation, and, by 1832, concern about a London cholera epidemic led The Poor Man's Guardian (18 February 1832) to write of Spitalfields:
The low houses are all huddled together in close and dark lanes and alleys, presenting at first sight an appearance of non-habitation, so dilapidated are the doors and windows:- in every room of the houses, whole families, parents, children and aged grandfathers swarm together.

In 1860, a treaty with France allowed the import of cheaper French silks. This left the many weavers in Spitalfields, as well as neighbouring Bethnal Green and Shoreditch, unemployed and indigent. New trades such as furniture and boot making came to the area, and the large windowed Huguenot houses were found suitable for tailoring, attracting a new population of Jewish refugees drawn to live and work in the textile industry.

By the later 19th century, inner Spitalfields became known as the worst criminal rookery in London and common lodging-houses in the Flower and Dean Street area were a focus for the activities of robbers and pimps. In 1881 Flower and Dean Street was described as being "perhaps the foulest and most dangerous street in the metropolis". Another claimant to the distinction of being the worst street in London was Dorset Street, which was highlighted by the brutal killing and mutilation of a young woman, Mary Jane Kelly, in her lodgings here by the serial killer, Jack the Ripper in the autumn of 1888. The murder was the climax of a series of murders that became known as the Whitechapel Murders. The renewed focus on the area's poverty helped prompt the decision to demolish some local slums in 1891–94. Deprivation continued and was brought to notice by social commentators such as Jack London in his The People of the Abyss (1903). He highlighted 'Itchy Park', next to Christ Church, Spitalfields, as a notorious rendezvous for homeless people.

Modern Spitalfields

In the late 20th century the Jewish presence diminished and was replaced by an influx of Bangladeshi immigrants, who also worked in the local textile industry and made Brick Lane the curry capital of London. By 1981, at least 60% of households were of minority ethnic origin.

Another development, from the 1960s onwards, has been a campaign to save the housing stock of old merchant terraces west of Brick Lane from demolition. Many have been conserved by the Spitalfields Historic Buildings Trust which has led to gentrification and a large increase in property prices.
In the 21st century, large office blocks were built between Bishopsgate and Spitalfields Market, effecting the character of the area. Conservationists secured the preservation of Old Spitalfields Market and the provision of shopping, leisure amenities and a plaza (urban square) beside the blocks, but permission was granted to developers, to demolish the Fruit and Wool exchange on the edge of old Spitalfields market, in order to erect office buildings.

Since 1998 the area has formed part of the Spitalfields and Banglatown electoral ward. The name reflecting the areas strong links with Bangladesh. In September 2015, a demonstration against gentrification in London took the form of a protest at Cereal Killer Cafe, a hipster café on Brick Lane which serves cereal.

Community 
Spitalfields has a very strong sense of local community, with the Spitalfields Community Group aiming to represent the people who both live and work, this is to build a better sense of community as well as improve the quality of life of its members and their neighbours in Spitalfields. and the Spitalfields Music who strengthen the local community through musical events. The Spitalfields Housing Association also works closely with residents by providing good quality community services. A community garden, Nomadic Community Gardens, is a social project based in an area once an area fenced off and overgrown and is popular among a diverse range of people such as locals without gardens, and is made up of found materials, street art, sculpture and allotments. Nomadic Community Gardens is a temporary project or "meanwhile use" run by a private limited company on behalf of the property developer Londonewcastle, which leases the site to the garden operator for a peppercorn rent and provided start-up funding. Londonewcastle gained planning consent for a development of "affordable housing, townhouses and apartments" on the site in November 2015. Construction on the Fleet Street Hill Project was intended to commence in 2016 but, as of June 2019, no work has begun on the site.

Culture 

Dennis Severs' House in Folgate Street is a "still-life drama" created by the Severs as an "historical imagination" of what life would have been like inside for a family of Huguenot silk weavers. In 2009, Raven Row, a non-profit contemporary art centre, opened to the public at 56 Artillery Lane. Constructed in a pair of 18th-century silk merchants' houses, onto which London practice 6a Architects added two contemporary galleries, it stands on the part of the street known until 1895 as Raven Row. Whitechapel Art Gallery is at the bottom of Brick Lane. 

Amongst the many well known artists living in Spitalfields are Gilbert and George, Ricardo Cinalli, Tracey Emin and Stuart Brisley. TV presenter, architecture expert and Georgian fanatic Dan Cruickshank was an active campaigner for Spitalfields, and continues to live in the area. Writer Jeanette Winterson turned a derelict Georgian house into an organic food shop, Verde's, as part of the Slow Food movement.

Spitalfields figures in a number of works of literature, including A New Wonder, a Woman Never Vexed (performed 1610–14; printed 1632) by William Rowley, a dramatisation of the foundation of St Mary Spital; The People of the Abyss (1903), the journalistic memoir by Jack London; Hawksmoor (1985) by Peter Ackroyd; Rodinsky's Room (1999) by Iain Sinclair and Rachel Lichtenstein; Brick Lane (2003) by Monica Ali; and The Quincunx (1991) by Charles Palliser.

19th-century Spitalfields is the setting for the film From Hell, a fictional retelling of the story of Jack the Ripper.

In December 2009 an anonymous Spitalfields resident started a blog called Spitalfields Life, writing under the pseudonym "The Gentle Author", and promising to post 10,000 daily essays. , the writer had posted over 4,000 articles about life in Spitalfields, and the surrounding areas within walking distance.

Economy
The economic makeup of Spitalfields is primarily centred around its four marketplaces. Old Spitalfields Market is the main one where traders sell antiques, food and fashion items, while Petticoat Lane Market mainly sells general clothing.

Notable people
William Allen (1770–1843), scientist and philanthropist 
Inga Beale (1963–) British businesswoman, the CEO of Lloyd's of London 2013-18.  Beale is Lloyd's first female CEO in the insurance market's 325-year history.
Dan Cruickshank (1949–), art and architectural historian
Nicholas Culpeper (1616–1654), botanist, herbalist, physician, and astrologer was born at the Red Lion Inn, when the area was still semi-rural.
Joan Dant (1631–1715), entrepreneur
Tracey Emin (1963–), artist, resides in Fournier Street.
Sandra Esqulant (1948–), landlady of The Golden Heart, is listed among the 100 most influential people in art.
Anna Maria Garthwaite (?1688-1763), designer of silk fabrics; blue plaque at 2 Princelet Street
Mark Gertler (1891–1939), painter, lesser member of the Bloomsbury Group, in love with Dora Carrington whom he met at the Slade School of Art. Born in Gun St of Polish Jewish parents.
Gilbert & George (1943–, 1942–), artists, reside in Fournier Street.
Samuel Gompers (1850–1924), founder of the American Federation of Labor (AFL), was born in Spitalfields in a Jewish family of cigarmakers originally from Amsterdam until emigration to New York in 1863.
Thomas Helwys (1575–1616), religious reformer who fled to Amsterdam in 1607/8, but returned in 1611 to found first Baptist congregation on British soil in Spitalfields.  Died in prison for public advocacy of religious liberty for all, regardless of creed, even Jews, Muslims, and atheists.
Basil Henriques (1890–1961), for whom Henriques Street (formerly Berner Street) is named.
Jack the Ripper: all of his victims or presumed victims lived in Spitalfields and two (Chapman and Kelly) were murdered there (the others being murdered in nearby Whitechapel):
Annie Chapman (1841–1888), resided at a common lodging house at 35 Dorset Street. Her body was found at 29 Hanbury Street
Mary Jane Kelly (1863–1888), lived and was murdered at 13 Millers Court, just off Dorset Street.
Martha Tabram (1849–1888), resided at a common lodging house at 19 George Street.
Mary Ann Nichols (1845–1888), resided at a common lodging house at 18 Thrawl Street.
Elizabeth Stride (1843–1888), resided at a common lodging house at 32 Flower and Dean Street.
Catherine Eddowes (1842–1888), resided with her partner John Kelly at Cooney's common lodging house at 55 Flower and Dean Street.
Keira Knightley (1985– ), actress, lived for a while on Wilkes Street.
Joe Loss LVO OBE (1909–1990), born locally, founder of the Joe Loss Orchestra.
Wolf Mankowitz (1924–1998), writer, playwright and screenwriter, of Russian Jewish descent, was born in Fashion Street.
Keith Mansfield, writer and publisher, lives locally.
Samantha Morton, actor, lived on Wilkes Street.
John Nicolson, one time journalist and broadcaster and a former MP for the Scottish National Party (2015-2017); owns a house on Fournier Street which he has restored and renovated himself.
George Peabody (1795–1869), established the Peabody Donation Fund, which continues to this day, as the Peabody Trust, to provide good quality housing "for the deserving poor" in London: the fund's first block of dwellings opened in Commercial Street in 1864.
Sian Phillips, (1933–), actress
Jonathan Pryce, (1947– ), actor and singer
Lutfur Rahman, first directly elected mayor of Tower Hamlets and former ward councillor
Dennis Severs (1944–1999), lived at 18 Folgate Street 1979–1999.
Jack Sheppard (1702–1724), highwayman and multiple absconder, born in New Fashion Street, now known as White's Row.
Obadiah Shuttleworth (died 1734), musician
Sir Benjamin Truman (1699/1700–1780), brewer.
Arnold Wesker (1932–2016), playwright, author, poet, born in Mother Levy's Maternity Home, Underwood Rd. With his family took refuge during WW2 in "Mickey's Shelter" below the Fruit & Wool Exchange.
Jeanette Winterson (1959–), writer, lives on Brushfield Street where she also runs a delicatessen.
Mary Wollstonecraft (1759–1797), early feminist, born locally, possibly at 21 Hanbury Street.
Joe Wright (1972–), film director, bought a house on Wilkes Street but in 2013 sold it to actor Jonathan Pryce

Transport

Railway
Spitalfields has no connection to the London Underground. Historically it had a station on the Great Eastern Main Line called Bishopsgate (Low Level) that opened on the 4 November 1872, but closed on 22 May 1916. Shoreditch tube station, the northern terminus of the East London Line, technically lay within the boundaries of Spitalfields, but principally served Shoreditch: it closed in 2006. Liverpool Street station (mainline and underground), Aldgate East (underground) and Shoreditch High Street (London Overground) are all in close proximity to Spitalfields.

Road
The area is formed around Commercial Street (on the A1202 London Inner Ring Road).

See also
List of schools in the London Borough of Tower Hamlets
Old Truman Brewery – The Black Eagle Brewery on Brick Lane, and into surrounding streets.
Spitalfields riots
Spitalfields Festival
Stepney Historical Trust

References

Further reading

External links 

London Metropolitan University East End Archive: The Paul Trevor Collection – photographs of the Spitalfields area from the 1970s to the 1990s.

 
Districts of the London Borough of Tower Hamlets
Areas of London
Former civil parishes in London
Bills of mortality parishes